Pre-dynastic period may refer to:

Pre-dynastic period of Sumer
Pre-dynastic period of Egypt